Mohammad Saif Hassan (born 30 October 1998) is a Bangladeshi cricketer. He made his international debut for the Bangladesh cricket team during tour to Pakistan in February 2020. Hassan's mother's family is from Sri Lanka.

Domestic career
In January 2017 in the 2016–17 National Cricket League, he became the youngest player in Bangladesh to score a first-class double century when he made 204 for Dhaka Division.

He made his Twenty20 debut for Prime Doleshwar Sporting Club in the 2018–19 Dhaka Premier Division Twenty20 Cricket League on 25 February 2019. He was the leading run-scorer in the 2018–19 Dhaka Premier Division Cricket League tournament, with 814 runs in 16 matches. In August 2019, he was one of 35 cricketers named in a training camp ahead of Bangladesh's 2019–20 season.

In November 2019, he was selected to play for the Khulna Tigers in the 2019–20 Bangladesh Premier League.

International career
In December 2015 he was named in Bangladesh's squad for the 2016 Under-19 Cricket World Cup. He was the captain of the Bangladesh U-19 side for the 2016 Asia Cup.

In December 2017, he was named as the captain of Bangladesh's squad for the 2018 Under-19 Cricket World Cup. In December 2018, he was named in Bangladesh's team for the 2018 ACC Emerging Teams Asia Cup.

In October 2019, he was named in Bangladesh's Test squad for the series against India. He did not play in the first Test, and on the eve of the second Test, he was ruled out of the match with a split webbing. In November 2019, he was named in Bangladesh's squad for the cricket tournament at the 2019 South Asian Games. The Bangladesh team won the gold medal, after they beat Sri Lanka by seven wickets in the final.

In February 2020, he was named in Bangladesh's squad for the first Test match against Pakistan. He made his Test debut for Bangladesh, against Pakistan, on 7 February 2020. On 8 September 2020, BCB confirmed that Saif along with a staff member was tested positive for COVID-19 just prior to the training camp as a warm up for the test series against Sri Lanka which was scheduled to be held in October 2020. He was immediately asked to self isolated by the BCB and was left out of Bangladesh's preliminary squad for the test series against Sri Lanka. A week later, he tested positive for COVID-19 for the second time in his second COVID-19 test.

In February 2021, he was selected in the Bangladesh Emerging squad for their home series against the Ireland Wolves. He was one of the leading run-scorers in the unofficial ODI series, with 190 runs in 5 matches, which included a ton. In April 2021, he was named in Bangladesh's preliminary Test squad for their series against Sri Lanka.

In November 2021, he was named in Bangladesh's Twenty20 International (T20I) squad for their series against Pakistan. He made his T20I debut on 19 November 2021, for Bangladesh against Pakistan.

References

External links

1998 births
Living people
Bangladeshi cricketers
Bangladesh Test cricketers
Bangladesh Twenty20 International cricketers
Barisal Division cricketers
Dhaka Division cricketers
Cricket Coaching School cricketers
Khulna Tigers cricketers
Prime Doleshwar Sporting Club cricketers
South Asian Games gold medalists for Bangladesh
South Asian Games medalists in cricket
Cricketers from Dhaka